Ceremony is the fourth studio album by American electronic rock duo Phantogram. The album was released by Republic Records on March 6, 2020. Its first single, "Into Happiness", released on May 31, 2019, reached number 21 on the Billboard Alternative Songs chart.

Track listing

Charts

References 

2020 albums
Phantogram (band) albums
Republic Records albums